Kaja Jerina (born 11 September 1992) is a Slovenian footballer playing for ŽNK Radomlje in the SŽNL and the Slovenia national team.

She started her career in ŽNK Senožeti, moving later to ŽNK Jevnica, and in 2011 she made her debut for the Slovenian national team. In 2014 she moved abroad, playing for Merilappi United in the Finland's Naisten Liiga, ASD Pink Sport Time in Italy's Serie A and SV Henstedt-Ulzburg in Germany's 2. Bundesliga before returning to the SŽNL to play for ŽNK Radomlje.

External links 
 

1992 births
Living people
Slovenian women's footballers
Merilappi United players
Kansallinen Liiga players
Serie A (women's football) players
Expatriate women's footballers in Finland
Expatriate women's footballers in Germany
Expatriate women's footballers in Italy
Footballers from Ljubljana
Slovenia women's international footballers
Slovenian expatriate sportspeople in Germany
Slovenian expatriate sportspeople in Italy
Women's association football defenders
A.S.D. Pink Sport Time players
ŽNK Radomlje players